Pycnandra petiolata is a species of plant in the family Sapotaceae. It is endemic to New Caledonia.

References

Endemic flora of New Caledonia
petiolata
Vulnerable plants
Taxonomy articles created by Polbot